Platysaurus is a genus of lizards, commonly known as flat lizards for their flat backs, in the family Cordylidae.

Geographic range
All species in the genus Platysaurus live in isolated populations in southern Africa. They are found in Mozambique, Zimbabwe, eastern Botswana, southern Namibia and northern and western South Africa.

Description

The species of Platysaurus exhibit sexual dimorphism. Females and juveniles often have black or brown backs with white stripes, while males are much more colored. Also, males are somewhat larger than females.

Species
The described species are:
Platysaurus attenboroughi  – Attenborough's flat lizard
Platysaurus broadleyi  – Broadley's flat lizard or Augrabies flat lizard 
Platysaurus capensis  – Cape flat lizard 
Platysaurus guttatus  – dwarf flat lizard
Platysaurus imperator  – emperor flat lizard
Platysaurus intermedius  – common flat lizard
Platysaurus lebomboensis  – Lebombo flat lizard 
Platysaurus maculatus  – spotted flat lizard 
Platysaurus minor  – Waterberg flat lizard
Platysaurus mitchelli  – Mitchell's flat lizard 
Platysaurus monotropis  – orange-throated flat lizard 
Platysaurus ocellatus  – ocellated flat lizard 
Platysaurus orientalis  – Sekukune flat lizard 
Platysaurus pungweensis  – Pungwe flat lizard 
Platysaurus relictus  – Soutpansberg flat lizard 
Platysaurus torquatus  – striped flat lizard

See also
Cordylidae
Pseudocordylus
Cordylus

References

Further reading
Boulenger GA (1885). Catalogue of the Lizards in the British Museum (Natural History). Second Edition. Volume II. ... Zonuridæ ... London: Trustees of the British Museum (Natural History). (Taylor and Francis, printers). xiii + 497 pp. + Plates I-XXIV. (Genus Platysaurus, p. 261).
Branch, Bill (2004). Field Guide to Snakes and other Reptiles of Southern Africa. Third Revised edition, Second impression. Sanibel Island, Florida: Ralph Curtis Books. 399 pp. . (Genus Platysaurus, p. 198).

External links
More Information

 
Lizard genera
Lizards of Africa
Taxa named by Andrew Smith (zoologist)